The Toyota C engine family was a series of inline-4 diesel engines. There were two earlier generations of an engine Toyota named as the "Type C". The first generation was introduced in 1940 as a modification of the Type A engine. This first "Type C" was installed in the Toyota AE. The second generation was the first diesel engine at 1500cc used in the CS20 series 1959 Toyota Crown in October 1959. Japanese market vehicles with diesel engines were exclusive to Toyota Japan dealerships called Toyota Diesel Shop locations from 1979 until the dealership was cancelled in 1988.

C
The original C engine was first introduced on October 11, 1958 in a prototype Crown Diesel (CS20) at the 5th Tokyo Motor Show with sales commencing in October 19 the following year. Derived from the R-series petrol engine, it has a displacement of 1,491 cc and produces . It was underpowered, and due to the use of the insufficiently strong R-series block it was also not very durable. When the new 3R engine required a re-designed block, Toyota chose to cancel the C engine rather than re-engineer it. Production ended in March 1961, and Toyota chose to focus on the more powerful diesel J engine which appeared in 1964.

Technical specifications:

 Type:4-stroke Inline 4 cylinder, Swirl Chamber Indirect Injection Diesel  
 Capacity: 1,491 cc
 Bore: 78 mm
 Stroke: 78 mm
 Compression Ratio: 19:1
 Power:  at 4000 rpm 
 Torque:  at 2400 rpm

Features at a glance

1C

1C, 1C-L, 1C-LC
The First Generation 1C was first introduced in the seventh generation Corona on January 26, 1982 and May 12, 1983 for transversely mounted applications as the 1C-L in the front-wheel drive models of the fifth Generation Corolla. It used a direct drive OHC mechanism that would later be adopted by the L series engine.

Technical specifications(1C/1C-L):

 Type:Inline 4, Precombustion Chamber Indirect Injection Diesel 
 Fuel injection system:Distributor Type
 Capacity: 1,839 cc
 Bore: 83 mm
 Stroke: 85 mm
 Compression Ratio: 22.5:1

Applications:

 at 4500 rpm,  at 3000 rpm (Japan, Gross JIS)

 CR26 TownAce/LiteAce Van 1982-1988 (Japan only)
 CM20/25 LiteAce Van /LiteAce Truck/TownAce Truck 1982-1986

-

 at 4500 rpm,  at 3000 rpm (Japan, Gross JIS) 
 CA60/67 Carina 1.2.1982-1988
 CE70/71/72 Corolla/Sprinter 8.2.1982-1987
 CE80 Corolla/Sprinter  1983-1987
 CT140/147 Corona 1.26.1982-1987

1C-II 
The second generation 1C engine updated with a higher compression ratio of 23:1

Applications:

 at 4700 rpm,  at 2600 rpm (Japan, Net JIS)

 CE90/91/96/97 Corolla/Sprinter 1987-1990 
 CM35/50 LiteAce Van/LiteAce Truck/TownAce Truck   1985-1989 (Japan only) (may also be available in Australia-CM35RVMRSBEQ)

1C-III 
Uprated version of the 1C-II

Applications:

 at 4700 rpm,  at 3000 rpm (Japan, Net JIS)
 CE90 Corolla/Sprinter Sedan 1990-1992

1C-TL, 1C-TLC 
Introduced on August 18, 1983 in the V10-series Camry/Vista it is the turbocharged version of the first generation 1C. This model was only installed in the V10-series Camry/Vista .

Applications:

 at 4500 rpm,  at 3000 rpm (US, Net SAE)

 at 4700 rpm,  at 2600 rpm (Europe)

 at 4700 rpm,  at 2400 rpm (Japan, Gross JIS) 
 CV10 Camry/Vista 1983-1985

2C 

The 2C was a long running diesel engine, with some models (e.g. Corona, Townace, Liteace) receiving the turbo version 2C-T which provided 65 kW. It was replaced by the more economical 3C-TE in the above models from 1999.

2C, 2C-L
Output:
 2C, 2C-L:  at 4700 rpm, and torque 97 lb·ft (132 N·m) at 3000 rpm
Applications:

 CT141 Corona taxi 1986-1991
 CXC10 Deliboy 1991-1994
 CM26 LiteAce 1985-1986 (Japan)

 at 4500 rpm,  at 3000 rpm (Europe, DIN)

 at 4500 rpm,  at 2600 rpm (Japan, Gross JIS)
 CT150 Carina/Carina II/Corona1984-1988 (Japan)

2C-II 
The second generation 2C engine updated with a higher compression ratio of 23:1

Applications:

 at 4600 rpm,  at 2600 rpm (Europe, EEC)

 CT150 Carina II1985-1988

 at 4700 rpm,  at 2600 rpm (Japan, Net JIS)

 at 4700 rpm,  at 2600 rpm (Japan, Gross JIS)

 CM30/31/36/41LiteAce Van and Wagon 1985-1992(Japan only)
 CR21/27/28/36 TownAce/LiteAce 1984-1996
 CM51/52/55/60/61/65 LiteAce / TownAce Truck 1989-1999 (Japan)

2C-III 
Uprated version of the 2C-II

Applications:

 at 4600 rpm,  at 2800 rpm (Pakistan, Net SAE)

 CE120 Corolla (Altis) 2001-2004 (Asia)
 CE140 Corolla (Altis) (Asia)

 at 4700 rpm,  at 3000 rpm (Japan, Net JIS)
 CE95 Corolla/Sprinter 1989-1991 (Japan)

 at 4700 rpm,  at 2800rpm (Japan, Net JIS)
 CE100/104/106/108/109  Corolla/Sprinter 1991-1998 (Japan)/1995-1998

 at 4700 rpm,  at 2800rpm (Japan, Net JIS)

 CE110/114 Corolla/Sprinter Sedan 1995-2001

 at 4700 rpm,  at 3000rpm (Japan, Net JIS)/(Europe)

 CT170/176/177 Carina/Corona/Carina II 1987-1992 (Japan)

 at 4700 rpm,  at 2500rpm (Japan, Net JIS)

 CR41V/51V TownAce/LiteAce Van 1996-1999 

 at 4600 rpm,  at 2500 rpm (Europe, EEC)

 at 4700 rpm,  at 2800rpm (Japan, Net JIS)

 CT190/190G/195/196/198 Caldina/Carina/Corona/Carina E 1992-1996 

 at 4600 rpm,  at 3000 rpm (Philippines, Net SAE)

 CF50 Tamaraw FX Wagon/Tamaraw Truck 1994-1998 (Philippines)

2C-E
EFI version of the 2C-III

Applications:

 at 4600 rpm,  at 2600 rpm (Europe)
 CE110 Corolla 23.05.1997-01.02.2000

2C-T, 2C-TL, 2C-TLC 
Turbocharged version of the 2C engine with a compression ratio of 22.5:1

Applications:

 at 4500 rpm,  at 3000rpm (US, Net SAE)

 CV11 Camry/Vista 1985-1986

2C-(II)T 
Turbocharged variant of the higher compression 2C-II engine adopting the Ceramic reinforced pistons from the 2LTE series.

Note: Toyota

Applications:

 at 4500 rpm,  at 2400rpm (Japan, Net JIS)
 CM30/40 LiteAce 1985-1992 (Japan only)

 at 4500 rpm,  at 2400rpm (Europe)

 at 4500 rpm,  at 2400rpm (Japan, Net JIS)
 CV20 Camry/Vista 1986-1991

 at 4500 rpm,  at 2400rpm (Japan, Net JIS)

 at 4000 rpm,  at 2400rpm (Japan, Gross JIS)
 CR21/28/30/37 LiteAce/TownAce 1984-1992 (Japan only)

2C-(III)T 
Revised variant of the 2C-(II)T fitted with Diesel Smoke Control System to meet stricter Japanese and Euro 2 emission standards.

Applications:

 CT220 Avensis 1997-2000 (ex. Europe)
Non Intercooled

 at 4000 rpm,  at 2000rpm (Europe)

 CT190/190G Carina E/Caldina 1994-1997

 at 4000 rpm,  at 2200rpm (Japan, Net JIS)
 CT210/215 Corona/Carina 1996-1997
Intercooled

 at 4400 rpm,  at 2600rpm (Japan, Net JIS)
 CV30 Camry/Vista 1990-1994

2C-TE
EFI variant of the 2C-(III)T adopting electronic throttle control.

Applications:

 at 4000 rpm,  at 2200 rpm (Europe)
 CT220 Avensis 1997-2000 (Europe only)

3C

Although having a larger displacement than the 2C-T, the 3C-TE was more economical and powerful at 100 PS. The C series engines were replaced by the CD series in the European market, while Toyota stopped selling diesel non-commercial models in Japan after the 3C-TE.

3C-E
EFI version with compression ratio of 23.0:1

79.0 PS (58.0 kW; 78.0 HP) at 4,400 rpm

Applications:

 CT197/199 Caldina 19.08.1998-07.2002 (Japan only)
 CR42/52 LiteAce/TownAce 1998-2006 (Japan only)

 at 4400 rpm,  at 2400 rpm (Japan, Net JIS)
 CE101/102/105/107 Corolla/Sprinter Van and Wagon 1998-2002 (Japan only)
 CE113/116 Corolla/Sprinter Sedan 1998-2000 (Japan only)
 CE121 Corolla/Corolla Fielder 2000-2002 (Japan only)
 CM70/75/80/85 LiteAce / TownAce 06.1999–08.2004 (Japan only)

3C-T
Turbocharged version with compression ratio of 22.6:1(Non Intercooled) or 20.0:1(Intercooled).

From 88.0 PS (65.0 kW; 87.0 HP) at 4,000 rpm
to 91.0 PS (67.0 kW; 90.0 HP) at 4,000 rpm

Applications:

Non Intercooled

 CR22/29/31/38 LiteAce / TownAce 1993-1996 (Japan only)

 at 4000 rpm,  at 2000 rpm (Japan, Net JIS)

 CV40/43 Vista/Camry  1994-1998 (Japan only)

 at 4000 rpm,  at 2200 rpm (Japan, Net JIS) 
 CR40G/50G LiteAce Noah / TownAce Noah 1996-2001 (Japan only) 
Intercooled

 at 4200 rpm,  at 2600 rpm (Japan, Net JIS)

 CXR10/11/20/21 Estima Lucida/Estima Emina 1993-1999 (Japan only)

3C-TE
Turbocharged version with EFI and compression ratio of 22.6:1.

From 94.0 PS (69.0 kW; 92.0 HP) at 4,400 rpm
to 100.0 PS (74.0 kW; 99.0 HP) at 4,200 rpm

Applications:

Non Intercooled

 at 4000 rpm,  at 2000-2400 rpm (Europe)

 at 4000 rpm,  at 2200 rpm (Japan, Net JIS)

 CXM10 Gaia/Ipsum/ Picnic

-

 at 4000 rpm,  at 2000 rpm (Japan, Net JIS) 
 CR40G/50G LiteAce Noah / TownAce Noah

-

 at 4000 rpm,  at 2200 rpm (Japan, Net JIS) 
 CT211/216/216G Carina/Corona/Caldina  1998-2001 (Japan only)

Intercooled

 at 4200 rpm,  at 2600 rpm (Japan, Net JIS)

 CXR10/11/20/21 Estima Lucida 1993-1999 (Japan only)

References 

C engine
Diesel engines by model
Straight-four engines